Karl Eduard Rothschuh (July 6, 1908, Aachen – September 3, 1984, Münster) was a German cardiac physiologist, medical historian, and medical philosopher. He studied medicine at Hamburg, Frankfurt am Main, Munich, Vienna, and finally Berlin, where he was award the Doctor of Medicine degree in 1937. He was a professor of physiology until 1960 and of history of medicine until 1973 at the University of Münster.   He is considered to be an important contributor to 20th-century German medical philosophy.   He was elected to the German National Academy of Sciences Leopoldina in 1969.

References

External links
 PubMed search for Karl Eduard Rothschuh

German physiologists
1908 births
1984 deaths
Medical historians
Philosophers of medicine
Academic staff of the University of Münster
Members of the German Academy of Sciences Leopoldina
People from Aachen